Eodorcadion chinganicum is a species of beetle in the family Cerambycidae. It was described by Suvorov in 1909. It is known from Mongolia.

Subspecies
 Eodorcadion chinganicum chinganicum Suvorov, 1909
 Eodorcadion chinganicum kerulenum Danilevsky, 2007
 Eodorcadion chinganicum rubrosuturale (Breuning, 1943)

References

Dorcadiini
Beetles described in 1909